Barrow upon Humber is a village and civil parish in North Lincolnshire, England. The population (including Barrow Hann) at the 2011 census was 3,022.

History
Barrow contains the site of a late Anglo-Saxon monastery, which has been fully excavated. The location is now built over, but is marked by a plaque in the village. King Wulfhere gave land to Caedda (Saint Chad) in the 7th century at Ad Barvae (at the wood).
It was on this site that the monastery was developed. The street adjacent to the monastery site is still known as St. Chad.

A windmill, known as Rigg's Mill, was located on the western side of the village but was largely demolished in 1928.

A limestone quarry existed on the south side of the village. Limestone was baked in retorts during the preparation of slaked lime. Remains of the retorts can be found on private property close to the quarry.

The village was bombed during the Second World War. Names of civilians killed are recorded on the cenotaph on the church grounds. Several unexploded bombs were removed from the village by military bomb disposal experts. It is possible that a German bomber dumped its bombs on the village instead of the intended nearby heavily defended target of Hull.

Culture and community
According to the 2001 census Barrow upon Humber had a population of 2,745.

For many years the village supported a mummers troupe known as the Plough-Jags. Such troupes were associated with the festivities of Plough Monday which marked the opening of the agricultural year.

There is one public house: the Royal Oak . The second: the Six Bells closed ~2019. A third public house, the Red Lion, situated on the lower High Street, reverted to a residence in the early 20th century.

John Harrison Church of England Primary School is situated on North Street. Built in the last decade of the 19th century and formerly named Barrow upon Humber Church of England Primary School, it was renamed in honour of John Harrison, designer of maritime chronometers, who lived in the village until 1736.

The village is the home of Barton-upon-Humber Rugby Union Football Club, whose clubhouse is on Mill Lane.

Barrow Bowls Club is a small but friendly lawn bowls club, playing in three leagues from May to September. The club house is located at the end of Thorngarth Lane  and is closely associated with Barrow Sports and Fitness Centre, which includes squash courts, snooker tables and a bar.

Landmarks
Many of the buildings in the centre of the village are of 18th- and 19th-century origin. A number of buildings of note include Down Hall, Barrow Hall, Papist Hall, Forester's Hall and West Cote Farm.

Church
The Norman church, with parts that appear to be of earlier origin, is situated on a hilltop to the north of the village and known as the Church of Holy Trinity. When the grounds of the church were landscaped during the 1960s, many graves were lost and the remains were reburied in a communal grave site close to the northern wall of the church. There was much controversy about the disturbing of graves at the time.

A sundial designed by James Harrison, younger brother of John Harrison, stood on the south side of the church near the cenotaph but this has now been removed and replaced by a replica. The church lytch gate was removed circa 1960 but there are still lich-stones on the right hand side when entering the church proper. The churchwarden's house that was located immediately to the east of the church path was condemned and demolished at about the same time. The church has a full peal of bells used frequently by local and visiting campanologists.

Thornton Abbey
Thornton Abbey is situated about 2 miles south from Barrow. On 5 October 1541 Henry VIII, after visiting Hull with the Privy Council, crossed the river in a naval vessel and disembarked at Barrow Haven and rode through Barrow en route to the abbey. Whilst the main part of the abbey has largely disappeared, the gatehouse remains and is open to the public.

Market Place
The market place is identified by the stump of a medieval cross. The gas lamp, installed during the Victorian period and which topped the stones, was removed in the first half of the 20th century. The marketplace has been remodelled to accommodate car parking but the original shape and size can be determined from the alignment of the houses on the northern and eastern sides. The space is used for a number of village events including the annual Wheelbarrow Weekend and the Christmas Fair. Recently trees have been planted to replace those removed in the early years of this century. New seating has been installed bearing motifs celebrating the life and work of John Harrison.

Village hall
The village hall is on the eastern side of the lower High Street and was once used as a cinema. A projection room was situated above the main entrance doorway. Access to hidden rooms could be attained through a trapdoor accessible through the ceiling of the projection room.

Blow wells and the Beck

Fresh water was available from the many springs in the area via two blow wells known as the Caedda Wells. Later this name was contracted; however the blow wells are still known by the locals as the Cadwells. Due to the limestone strata, there are many freshwater springs in the area. One such spring is the source of the local stream known as the Beck. It flows through the village in roughly a south-west/north-east direction. Where it passes beneath Beck Lane, there is a restored hand-operated pump which originally drew water up into the barrels on horse-drawn carts. These carts would then deliver the water to houses in the village that had no water source of their own.

Once clear of the village, the Beck is known as the Leden and passes through sluice gates to flow to Barrow Haven, and then flows into the River Humber. The original sluice gates were of wooden construction and situated beneath the small stone bridge at Ferry Road, Barrow Haven. The gates were two opposing, free-swinging, vertically-hinged doors and closed with the pressure of incoming tidal water, thus preventing salt water and, more importantly, flood water from flowing into the Leden and possibly flooding the low-lying farmlands at Barrow Hann, which lies between Barrow Haven and Barrow upon Humber. New sluice gates have been constructed since the 1960s approximately 50 yards downstream of Ferry Road.

Notable people
 St Chad was given land to found a monastery at Barrow, by King Wulfhere of Mercia.
 Barrow was the birthplace of John Sergeant, the Roman Catholic priest, controversialist and theologian (1623–1707).
 Barrow upon Humber was the home of John Harrison, the pioneer of a fail-safe way of establishing longitude at sea. A copy of Harrison's 1759 marine chronometer, H4, made by Larcum Kendall, and referred to as K1, travelled in 1772 with Captain Cook on his second Pacific voyage. Captain Cook grew to trust and rely on the timekeeper, which helped contribute to timekeepers being accepted as the way forward in the practical method of determining longitude at sea. Harrison was the subject of the 2000 film Longitude starring Michael Gambon. In television, the premise of the discovery of Harrison's clock was used in the plot of several episodes of the BBC situation-comedy Only Fools and Horses in which the main characters, the Trotter brothers, became overnight millionaires following the auction of such an item.
Admiral Nigel Malim was born at Barrow in 1919.
Richard Duffill, a long-time resident of the village, is featured in the travel books The Great Railway Bazaar and The Kingdom by the Sea by the American writer Paul Theroux.

Other
The German Honorary Consul, covering the East Riding of Yorkshire, Kingston upon Hull, North Lincolnshire, North East Lincolnshire, Humberside, Lincolnshire and Nottinghamshire as well as Nottingham resides in Barrow upon Humber.

References

External links
 
 Village website
 

Villages in the Borough of North Lincolnshire
Civil parishes in Lincolnshire